Lovesliescrushing (stylized lovesliescrushing) is an American ambient and shoegaze band from East Lansing, Michigan, United States, formed in 1991. The two primary members of the band are Scott Cortez (guitars, loops, treatments) and Melissa Arpin-Duimstra (vocals). 

Several guest musicians have joined the group for live performances, including Michael Anderson (Turn Pale, Drekka), Ana Breton (Dead Leaf Echo, Mahogany), Alyssa Browne and Andrew Prinz (Mahogany).

Cortez is acclaimed for his technical creativity, use of studio effects and for recording all the lovesliescrushing albums on a TASCAM Portastudio. In a 2010 interview, he said, "I use several loopers, EQ and reverb mostly to manipulate time and sound. I also have had a few custom instruments to explore new textures. But the most important gear are my ears and brain, without them, you have no imagination running the tools." 

Cortez has cited influences such as My Bloody Valentine, John Cage, Cocteau Twins, Brian Eno, Robert Fripp, Adrian Belew, György Ligeti, Harold Budd, Jon Hassell, Steve Reich, Terry Riley, Arvo Pärt, Henryk Górecki, Glenn Branca and film soundtracks.

History

Formation and early career 
Cortez and Arpin-Duimstra formed Lovesliescrushing in 1991 in East Lansing and later moved to Tucson, Arizona. In 1992, the duo issued the Bloweyelashwish cassette LP on their own Lullaby label, featuring different mixes of the songs from their debut album, similarly titled Bloweyelashwish

Lovesliescrushing signed a record deal with Projekt Records, who issued their debut album on CD and cassette in 1994, along with the "Youreyesimmaculate" single. Ned Raggett of AllMusic later described the album as "an amazing sonic bomb".

The more experimental follow-up, Xuvetyn, was released in 1996. AllMusic called it "even more of a mindblowing blast than Bloweyelashwish, 20 minutes longer and extending the spirit of that album's collision between brute feedback and serene sculpture in astounding directions".

Other projects 
Between 1996 and 2002, Cortez left Projekt to front Astrobrite on the Sonic Syrup label.

In 1997, Cortez and Anderson formed two short lived projects, Vir (who released the "Strika" 7" in 2000 on Drone Records) and Transient Stellar. The latter performed as Lovesliescrushing at Projektfest 1997, utilizing an early melding of jungle and shoegaze.

Return 
Lovesliescrushing returned in 2002 with the Glissceule album, released by Sonic Syrup. AllMusic called it "a mesmerizing collection of beautiful noise, 17 tracks of pearly lightness, angelically naïve with drumless textures". It was followed later that year by Voirshn, a Projekt release consisting of tracks that were left off of "Glissceule". These albums relied less on guitar,  and Cortez dubbed the band's new sound "glitch bliss". 

The Chorus album appeared in 2007 on the Peru-based Automatic Entertainment label; a reworked version, CRWTH (Chorus Redux), was issued by the Line label in 2010.

In 2010, Projekt issued the Girl. Echo. Suns. Veils. box set, which included a bonus second disc titled Avianium (Microphona Magnetica); the latter was also issued separately as Aviatrix.

Lovesliescrushing released two albums in 2012, Shiny Tiny Stars (Handmade Birds) and Glinter (Thisquietarmy Records). They self-released the Ghost Colored Halo digital EP in 2013, reissued two years later on CD by Projekt.

In 2020 they returned with a split album with Peruvian noise artist Fiorella16 titled "Extrañas Letanías" the album featured a more dreary atmosphere and was released in a very lowkey fashion

Discography

Studio albums 

 Bloweyelashwish (1992, Lullaby)
 Bloweyelashwish (1994, Projekt Records)
 Xuvetyn (1996, Projekt Records)
 Global and Available split with Freezing Butterfly (2001, Type Records)
 Glissceule (2002, Sonic Syrup)
 Voirshn (2002, Projekt Records)
 Chorus (2007, Automatic Entertainment)
 CRWTH (Chorus Redux) (2010, Line)
 Girl. Echo. Suns. Veils. (2010, Projekt Records)
 Aviatrix (2010, Projekt Records)
 Shiny Tiny Stars (2012, Handmade Birds)
 Glinter (2012, Thisquietarmy Records)
 Extrañas Letanías split with Fiorella16 (2020, Astromelia)

EPs 
 Ghost Colored Halo (2013, self-released; 2015, Projekt Records)

Singles 
 "Youreyesimmaculate" 7" (1994, Projekt Records)
 "Heart of Fire" digital (2011, EverythingIsChemical)

Compilation appearances
 "Babysbreath (Mycomion)" on Terra X - Vol. 1 Love and Hate (1993, Terra X Records)
 "Babysbreath" on Beneath the Icy Floe - Projekt Record's Sampler (1994, Projekt Records)
 "Teardrop/Dizzy" on Beneath the Icy Floe. V. 2 (1994, Projekt Records)
 "These Fleeting Moments" on Of These Reminders (1994, Projekt Records)
 "Babysbreath" on Beneath the Icy Floe, V. 3 (1995, Projekt Records)
 "Jingle Bells (Snowblower)" on Excelsis (A Dark Noël) (1995, Projekt Records)
 "Bones of Angels" on Beneath the Icy Floe V. 4 - A Projekt Sampler (1996, Projekt Records)
 "Blooded & Blossom-Blown" on Beneath the Icy Floe V.5 (1997, Projekt Records)
 "Lips to Kiss" on Splashed with Many a Speck (1997, Dewdrops Records)
 "Valerian (Mix 1)" on Projekt 100: The Early Years 1985-1995 (2000, Projekt Records)
 "Nipra" on Losing Yesterday (2000, Bluesanct)
 "Pink Blind" on Epithalamia (2000, Clairecords)
 "Sofvx" on Projekt 2003.1 (2003, Projekt Records)
 "Your Eyes Immaculate" on Projekt 200 (2007, Projekt Records)
 "The Way of the Sea (Deep Blue)" on Glass (2012, Rádio Etiópia)

References

External links
Lovesliescrushing on Bandcamp.com
Scott Cortez Interview
Interview: Scott Cortez of Astrobrite, Lovesliescrushing, STAR, and Polykroma
Lovesliescrushing Interview (October 1995) for QRD
Strangeways Radio Shoegaze Spotlight on Lovesliescrushing

Musical groups established in 1991
1991 establishments in Michigan
Musical groups from Michigan
American pop music groups
Projekt Records artists
American shoegaze musical groups